The 2021 nine-pin bowling World Team Championships was the ninth edition of the team championships and held in Tarnowo Podgórne, Poland, in October 2021.

In men's tournament Serbia has secured gold medal, while in women's tournament world champion title was captured by Germany.

Postponement and new bidding
Initially scheduled to take place from 19 May to 29 May 2021 and be held in Plauen, Germany, however, on August 31, 2020, the contract with the WNBA was terminated.

On December 21, WNBA announced that due to the COVID-19 pandemic, the championship scheduled for May will not be held. The event will not be moved to another date.

There were plans to organize the championships on special rules together with the youth championships in Kranj and Kamnik, but it was not approved by the national federations. On July 21, during the online conference, Tarnowo Podgórne was chosen as the host of the October competition as compensation for the championships not held a year earlier.

Schedule

Two competitions was held.

All time are local (UTC+2).

Participating teams

Men

Women

Medal summary

Medal table

References 

Nine-pin bowling World Team Championships
2021 in bowling
2021 in Polish sport
International sports competitions hosted by Poland
nine-pin bowling
Nine-pin